Ella Mae Morse (September 12, 1924 – October 16, 1999) was an American singer of popular music whose 1940s and 1950s recordings mixing jazz, blues, and country styles influenced the development of rock and roll. Her 1942 recording of "Cow-Cow Boogie" with Freddie Slack and His Orchestra gave Capitol Records its first gold record. In 1943, her single "Get On Board, Little Chillun", also with Slack, charted in what would soon become the R&B charts, making her one of the first white singers to do so. Morse stopped recording in 1957 but continued to perform and tour into the 1990s. In 1960 she received a star on the Hollywood Walk of Fame.

Career
Morse was born in Mansfield, Texas. She was hired by Jimmy Dorsey when she was 14 years old. In 1942, at the age of 17, she joined Freddie Slack's band, with whom in the same year she recorded "Cow-Cow Boogie (Cuma-Ti-Yi-Yi-Ay)", the first gold record released by Capitol Records. "Mr. Five by Five" was also recorded by Morse with Slack, and became a hit record in 1942 (Capitol 115). She also originated the wartime hit "Milkman, Keep Those Bottles Quiet", which was later popularized by Nancy Walker in the 1944 film Broadway Rhythm.

In 1943, Morse began to record solo. She reached #1 in the R&B chart with "Shoo-Shoo Baby" in December for two weeks. In the same year she performed "Cow Cow Boogie" in the film Reveille with Beverly and co-starred in Universal's South of Dixie, Ghost Catchers with Olsen and Johnson, and How Do You Dooo?, a vehicle for radio's "Mad Russian", Bert Gordon.  She sang in a wide variety of styles, and she had hits on both the U.S. pop and rhythm and blues charts. However, she never received the popularity of a major star.

The song "Love Me or Leave Me" as recorded by Morse was released by Capitol Records as catalog number 1922, with the flip side "Blacksmith Blues", which became her biggest hit.

In 1946, "House of Blue Lights" by Freddie Slack and Morse, (written by Slack and Don Raye) saw them perform what was one of many of Raye's songs picked up by black R&B artists. Her biggest solo success was "Blacksmith Blues" in 1952, which sold over one million copies, and was awarded a gold disc. The same year her version of "Down the Road a Piece" appeared on Capitol with Slack again on piano accompaniment. Morse also recorded a version of "Oakie Boogie" for Capitol which reached #23 in 1952. Her version was one of the first songs arranged by Nelson Riddle.

Morse ceased recording in 1957, but continued performing until the early 1990s, under the new management of Alan Eichler, performing at such clubs as Michael's Pub in New York, Ye Little Club in  Beverly Hills, the Hollywood Roosevelt Hotel's Cinegrill and the Vine St. Bar and Grill.  She appeared regularly at Disneyland for several years with the Ray McKinley Orchestra, and did a successful tour of Australia shortly before her final illness.

Her music career was profiled in Nick Tosches' 1984 book, The Unsung Heroes of Rock 'N' Roll: The Birth of Rock in the Wild Years Before Elvis. She has a star on the Hollywood Walk of Fame at 1724 Vine Street.  Her entire recorded body of work was issued in a deluxe box set by Bear Family Records and a rare live performance, "Ella Mae Morse On Broadway," was released in 2011.

Musical style
As Morse's musical style blended jazz, blues, and country, she has sometimes been called the first rock 'n' roll singer.  A good example is her 1942 recording of the song "Get On Board, Little Chillun", which, with strong gospel, blues, boogie, and jive sounds as a genuine precursor to the later rockabilly/ rock 'n roll songs.
Her records sold well to both Caucasian and African-American audiences.  As she was not well known at the time of her first solo hits, many people assumed she was African-American because of her 'hip' vocal style and choice of material.

Personal life
Morse had six children from four marriages, several grandchildren, great-grandchildren, and an estranged sister named Flo Handy who was also a singer.

In 1999 Morse died of respiratory failure in Bullhead City, Arizona, at the age of 75.

Discography

Albums as a leader
Dynamite Texas Diva Live (1940s live recordings, released by Collectors Choice, 2003)
Barrelhouse, Boogie and the Blues with Big Dave and his orchestra (Capitol, 1957)
Morse Code (Capitol, 1957)
compilations:
Morse Code Collection (Jasmine Records, 2005)
Singles Collection, 1942-57 (Acrobat Records, 2018)

Hit singles

As a collaborator or side performer
Ella Mae Morse and Freddie Slack, The Hits of Ella Mae Morse and Freddie Slack (Capitol, 1962)
Herbie Mann, Ella Mae Morse, Jimmy Giuffre, Sessions, Live (Calliope, 1976)
Red Norvo Quintet,  With Guest Vocalists Mavis Rivers And Ella Mae Morse (United, 1962; released by Studio West, 1990)

See also

List of jump blues musicians
List of artists who reached number one on the Billboard R&B chart
First rock and roll record

References

External links

Prescottlink.com
Ella Mae Morse Interview NAMM Oral History Library (1995)

1924 births
1999 deaths
Jump blues musicians
Deaths from respiratory failure
People from Bullhead City, Arizona
Singers from Texas
American women jazz singers
American jazz singers
People from Mansfield, Texas
20th-century American singers
20th-century American women singers
Capitol Records artists
Jazz musicians from Texas